Glas New Russian Writing is a series dedicated to the dissemination of contemporary Russian literature in English. Many of their authors were first published in English by Glas. The series editors are Natasha Perova and Joanne Turnbull.

List of titles
 Revolution
 Soviet Grotesque
 Women's View, anthology
 Love and Fear
 Bulgakov and Mandelstam
 Jews and Strangers
 Booker Winners and Others
 Love Russian Style
 The Scared Generation
 Booker Winners and Others II 
 Captives
 A Will and a Way: an anthology of women's writing
 Beyond the Looking Glas
 Peter Aleshkovsky, Skunk: A Life
 Childhood, Zip and other stories
 Ludmila Ulitskaya, Sonechka
 Asar Eppel, The Grassy Street
 Boris Slutsky, Things That Happened
 The Portable Andrei Platonov
 Leonid Latynin, The Face-Maker and the Muse
 Leonid Latynin, The Lair
 Irina Muravyova, The Nomadic Soul 
 Anatoly Mariengof, A Novel Without Lies
 Alexander Genis, Red Bread
 Larissa Miller, Dim and Distant Days
 Andrei Volos, Hurramabad 
 Lev Rubinstein, Here I Am
 Andrei Sergeev, Stamp Album
 Valery Ronshin, Living a Life
 NINE of Russia's Foremost Women Writers, an anthology
 Alexander Selin, The New Romantic
 Nina Lugovskaya, The Diary of a Soviet Schoolgirl: 1932-1937
 Nina Gabrielyan, Master of the Grass
 Strange Soviet Practices
 Nikolai Klimontovich, The Road to Rome
 Alan Cherchesov, Requiem for the Living
 The Scared Generation. Vasil Bykov and Boris Yampolsky
 Captives. 2nd edition 
 Sigizmund Krzhizhanovsky, Seven Stories
 War & Peace. (Army stories versus women's stories)
 Andrei Sinyavsky, Ivan the Fool, Russian Folk Belief
 Alexander Pokrovsky and Alexander Terekhov: Sea Stories. Army Stories
 Maria Galina, Iramifications
 Roman Senchin, Minus
 Mikhail Levitin, A Jewish God in Paris
 Kristina Rotkirch, Contemporary Russian Fiction. A Short List
 Squaring the Circle, stories by winners of the Debut Prize for Fiction
 Mendeleev Rock, two short novels by Andrei Kuzechkin and Pavel Kostin
 Michele A. Berdy, The Russian Word’s Worth.
 The Scared Generation. Boris Yampolsky’s The Old Arbat & Vasil Bykov's The Manhurt. (3rd edition)
 Off the Beaten Track. Stories by Russian Hitchhikers
 Vlas Doroshevich, What the Emperor Cannot Do. Tales and Legends of the Orient.# Arslan Khasavov, Sense
 Still Waters Run Deep. Young Women’s Writing from Russia. Anthology
 Alexander Snegirev, Petroleum Venus
 Dmitry Vachedin, Snow Germans
 Anna Babiashkina, Before I Croak
 Igor Savelyev, Mission to Mars
 Liza Alexandrova-Zorina, The Little Man
 Russian Drama. Four Young Female Voices
 Anna Lavrinenko, Yaroslavl Stories 
 A.J.Perry, Twelve Stories of Russia
 Alexander Pokrovsky, Subs, Subs, Subs… Sea Stories
 NINE of Russia's Foremost Women Writers
 Anatoly Mariengof, A Novel Without Lies & Cynics
 Captives. 3rd edition
 Strange Soviet Practices. 2nd edition

References

Russian literature